Jan Holleman (25 December 1918 – 5 August 1996) was a Dutch footballer. He played in three matches for the Netherlands national football team in 1946.

References

External links
 

1918 births
1996 deaths
Dutch footballers
Netherlands international footballers
Place of birth missing
Association footballers not categorized by position